David Andrew McCarty (born November 23, 1969) is a former first baseman and outfielder in Major League Baseball. From 1993 through 2005, McCarty played with the Minnesota Twins (1993–1995), San Francisco Giants (1995–1996), Seattle Mariners (1998), Kansas City Royals (2000–2002), Tampa Bay Devil Rays (2002), Oakland Athletics (2003) and Boston Red Sox (2003–2005). He batted right-handed and threw left-handed.

Career
McCarty attended Stanford University, and in 1989 he played collegiate summer baseball with the Cotuit Kettleers of the Cape Cod Baseball League. He was drafted by the Twins in the 1st round (3rd overall) of the 1991 Major League Baseball draft. In an eleven-season career, he was a .242 hitter with 36 home runs and 175 RBI in 630 games.

A utility player in the purest sense, McCarty was a defensive first baseman and outfielder who occasionally was called upon to pitch. His most productive season came in 2000 for the Royals, when he posted career-highs in batting average (.278), home runs (12), RBI (68), runs (34), hits (75), doubles (14) and games played (103).

On August 4, 2003, McCarty was claimed off waivers by the Boston Red Sox from the Oakland Athletics.

2004 highlights
On May 11, 2004, in the bottom of the eighth inning, original pinch-hitter Brian Daubach was called back to the bench after the Indians made a pitching change and decided to go to lefty Scott Stewart. McCarty, due to hitting well against lefties, was sent up to hit by manager Terry Francona. On an 0-1 pitch, McCarty lined a two-run triple to right field that gave the Red Sox a 5-3 lead. They went on to win by that score.

On May 30, 2004, McCarty, who had entered the game in the eighth inning, hit a walk-off two-run home run against Mariners pitcher J. J. Putz in the bottom of the twelfth inning to give the Red Sox a 9-7 victory.

Release and retirement
McCarty, who was released by the Boston Red Sox in May 2005 after the team signed first baseman, John Olerud, refused a minor league assignment. He retired and was a Red Sox analyst on NESN from July 1, 2005 until the end of the 2008 season.
McCarty was an oddity in MLB in that he batted right-handed and threw left-handed, and was a position player as opposed to a pitcher.

Pitching
McCarty made three pitching appearances for the Red Sox in 2004. The first was during the April 9 home opener against the Toronto Blue Jays, the second was in the June 12 game against the Los Angeles Dodgers in which he struck out Jayson Werth and finally, in the final game of the season, McCarty went two scoreless innings against the Baltimore Orioles in which he struck out Rafael Palmeiro, Larry Bigbie and David Newhan.

Personal life
Born in Houston, Texas, McCarty graduated from Sharpstown High School in 1988 before attending Stanford University. He lives in Piedmont, California with his wife, Monica, and their two children.

References

External links

McCarty expands repertoire - Jayson Stark, ESPN

1969 births
Living people
Boston Red Sox players
Kansas City Royals players
Major League Baseball first basemen
Major League Baseball outfielders
Baseball players from Texas
Minnesota Twins players
Oakland Athletics players
People from Houston
San Francisco Giants players
Seattle Mariners players
Stanford Cardinal baseball players
Cotuit Kettleers players
Tampa Bay Devil Rays players
People from Piedmont, California
Orlando Sun Rays players
Visalia Oaks players
Portland Beavers players
Salt Lake Buzz players
Indianapolis Indians players
Phoenix Firebirds players
Tacoma Rainiers players
Toledo Mud Hens players
Durham Bulls players
Sacramento River Cats players
Lowell Spinners players
Pawtucket Red Sox players
All-American college baseball players